Ficarazzi is a comune (municipality) in the Metropolitan City of Palermo in the Italian region of Sicily, located about  southeast of Palermo.

Ficarazzi borders the following municipalities: Bagheria, Misilmeri, Palermo, Villabate.

References

Municipalities of the Metropolitan City of Palermo